HD 125612 d is an extrasolar planet which orbits the G-type main sequence star HD 125612, located approximately 172 light years away in the constellation Virgo. The discovery of this planet was announced by the HARPS team on October 19, 2009, together with 31 other planets, including HD 125612 c.

In 2022, the true mass and inclination of HD 125612 d were measured via astrometry.

References

Exoplanets discovered in 2009
Exoplanets detected by radial velocity
Exoplanets detected by astrometry
Giant planets
Virgo (constellation)